Cara Black and Liezel Huber defeated Katarina Srebotnik and Ai Sugiyama in the final, 5–7, 6–3, [10–8] to win the doubles tennis title at the 2007 WTA Tour Championships.

Lisa Raymond and Samantha Stosur were the reigning champions, but did not participate this year.

This was the first edition of the tournament to utilise a super tiebreak instead of a third set.

Seeds

Draw

Finals

References

Doubles